Cywiński (feminine Cywińska) is a Polish surname. Notable people include:

 Bernard Cywinski, American architect
 Czesław Cywiński, Polish resistance fighter
 Józef Cywiński, Polish-American scientist
 Kevin Cywinski, American racing driver
 Piotr Cywiński, Polish historian
see also:

 Cywiński Lublin - Polish gliders designed by eng. Stanisław Cywiński, produced by Plage i Laśkiewicz.

Polish-language surnames